The Stockbridge Anticline is one of a series of parallel east-west trending 
folds in the Cretaceous chalk of Hampshire. It lies at the western end of the South Downs, immediately to the north of the Winchester-King's Somborne Syncline and east of Salisbury Plain.

Structure

Hills include Danebury and Chattis Hill to the west, Stockbridge Down, Woolbury, Chilbolton Down, Windmill Hill (Crawley) and Abbotstone Down.

Parallel folds to the south include the Winchester-East Meon Anticline and the Winchester-King's Somborne Syncline. To the north is the Micheldever Syncline. As with other nearby folds, the structure is controlled by movement of fault blocks within the Jurassic strata below.

See also
List of geological folds in Great Britain

References

Anticlines
Geology of Hampshire